Microsoft SwiftKey is a virtual keyboard app originally developed by TouchType for Android and iOS devices. It was first released for Android in July 2010, followed by an iOS release in September 2014 following Apple's implementation of third-party keyboard support. 

SwiftKey uses machine learning to predict text inputs, as well as supporting swipe gestures and docking features.

History 
The company behind SwiftKey was founded in 2008 by Jon Reynolds, Ben Medlock and Chris Hill-Scott. Its head office is at the Microsoft offices in Paddington, London, and other offices are located in San Francisco, and Seoul.

In September 2013, SwiftKey announced a series B finance round totalling $17.5 million and led by Index Ventures, along with Octopus Investments and Accel Partners.

In May 2014, SwiftKey hired James Bromley as COO.

In February 2016, SwiftKey was purchased by Microsoft, for $250 million.

In May 2020, the app was rebranded as Microsoft SwiftKey to reflect its present ownership.

In September 2022, Microsoft announced it was terminating support for the iOS version of SwiftKey. The app was removed from the App Store on October 5th.

In November 2022, Microsoft announced a reversal of its decision to discontinue SwiftKey for iOS devices. The app was relisted on November 18th, with Microsoft promising future updates for the app. The company cited "customer feedback" as a reason for SwiftKey's return.

Overview
SwiftKey's Prediction Engine allows the program to learn from usage and improve predictions. The feature allows the tool to improve with usage, learning from SMS, Facebook, Gmail, Twitter, and an RSS feed.

Beta
SwiftKey was first released as a beta in the Android Market on 14 July 2010, supporting seven languages. It included a variety of settings to adjust audio feedback volume and length of haptic feedback vibration. It was announced on SwiftKey's official website on 15 May 2014, that a Japanese version was out in beta. People registered on SwiftKey VIP were able to download the beta version.

SwiftKey X
On 14 July 2011, SwiftKey X was released to the Android Market as an upgrade to SwiftKey. Along with new and updated features, SwiftKey X introduced a dedicated app for tablets, called SwiftKey Tablet X. The updates included:
 A new artificial intelligence engine, to predict phrases and learn the user's writing style
 A cloud-based personalization service, which analyses how the user types in Gmail, Twitter, Facebook, and text messages, to predict phrases in the user's style
 A technology that continually monitors the user's typing precision and adapts the touch-sensitive area of the touch screen for each key
 Simultaneous use of multiple languages; this allows users to type in up to three languages at once, with auto-correction that is language-aware
 Split key layout on SwiftKey Tablet X, to improve thumb typing while using a larger touchscreen
 Additional language support

SwiftKey 3
The SwiftKey 3 update was released on 21 June 2012, including:
 Smart Space – this detects spurious or missing spaces in real time
 Additional language support

SwiftKey 4
The SwiftKey 4 update was released on 20 February 2013, including:
 SwiftKey Flow – a gesture input method with real-time predictions
 Flow Through Space – a gesture to input whole sentences, by gliding to the spacebar
 An enhanced prediction engine
 Additional language support, raising the total to 60
 SwiftKey 4.2 introduced SwiftKey Cloud, allowing users to backup and sync their language behaviour and software settings, plus Trending Phrases – a feature adding the phrases causing a buzz on Twitter and localized news sites

SwiftKey 5
The SwiftKey 5 update was released in June 2014, including:
 Freemium transition – the app dropped its price-tag to be free to download
 SwiftKey Store – Theme store of free and paid-for colour schemes for the app
 Emoji – 800 emoji were added, plus Emoji Prediction feature, which learns to predict relevant emoji icons
 Number Row (a row of number keys) option added, in response to customer requests
 New languages, including Belarusian, Mongolian, Tatar, Uzbek and Welsh added

SwiftKey 6
The SwiftKey 6 update was released in November 2015, including:
 Double-Word Prediction which adds a new dimension to the predictions you see, predicting your next two words at once.
 A redesign of the emoji panel.
 A complete overhaul of the settings menu in the style of Material Design to make it easier to fine tune and customize the keyboard
 5 new languages added: Yoruba, Igbo, Zulu, Xhosa & Breton

SwiftKey 7.0
The SwiftKey 7.0 update was released in March 2018, including:
 A new toolbar
 The ability for one to use their own stickers directly within the software.
 Support for 28 additional languages.

SwiftKey for iOS

SwiftKey released an iOS application on 30 January 2014, called Swiftkey Note, which incorporates SwiftKey's predictive typing technology as a custom toolbar attached to the top of the regular iOS keyboard.

Starting with iOS 8, released in the second half of 2014, the operating system enables and support third party keyboards use. SwiftKey confirmed that it was working on a keyboard replacement app.

Starting with iOS 13, the system keyboard comes with a built in QuickPath mechanism, which works similarly to SwiftKey's swiping feature.

SwiftKey for iOS was announced to be deprecated in September 2022. In November 2022, Microsoft reverted this decision however.

SwiftKey for iPhone

SwiftKey Keyboard for iPhone, iPad and iPod Touch launched in September 2014 to coincide with the launch of Apple's iOS 8 update. It was unveiled at TechCrunch Disrupt in San Francisco.

The app includes the word prediction and auto-correction features, familiar to the Android product, SwiftKey Cloud backup and sync and personalization, and a choice of color themes.

It reached No. 1 in the free US App Store charts and the company confirmed it had been downloaded more than 1 million times on the first day of launch.

Further development 
On 27 February 2012, the SwiftKey SDK was launched. This allows developers on multiple platforms and programming languages to access SwiftKey's core language-engine technology for their own UI or virtual keyboard.

In June 2012, SwiftKey released a specialized version of its keyboard called SwiftKey Healthcare. It is a virtual keyboard for iOS, Android, Windows Phone and BlackBerry devices that offers next-word predictions based on real-world clinical data. In October 2012, SwiftKey Healthcare won the Appsters Award for Best Enterprise App 2012.

In April 2016, SwiftKey released a keyboard that emulated William Shakespeare's speech called ShakeSpeak in observance of the 400th year of the author's death. The app was co-developed with VisitLondon.com to promote more tourism to the metropolitan area of London.

SwiftKey integration was included with Windows 10 beginning with the October 2018 Update. However, these features were later removed from Windows 10 beginning with the May 2020 Update.

Controversy 
In 2015, NowSecure reported a vulnerability present in the version of SwiftKey pre-installed on Samsung devices, the issue occurred when the keyboard attempts to update its language pack. Samsung has since released security and firmware update to mitigate the issue. However, TechCrunch published an article on why the issue happened because of how Samsung implemented the keyboard system on its devices.

In 2016, SwiftKey users began reporting that the app was displaying personal details as suggested words to other users who did not have previous connections. Other issues included foreign languages and obscene words. SwiftKey responded by disabling cloud sync for word suggestion and released an update to mitigate the issue.

Awards
SwiftKey has received multiple awards, including:
 Sunday Times Hiscox Tech Track 100 2014 ranked third place
 Meffy Award for life tools 2014
 Meffy Award for mobile innovation 2013
 Appsters Champion and Best Consumer App 2013
 Lovie Award People's Lovie for mobile innovation 2013
 Most Effective Mobile Application - b2c, Mobile Marketing Magazine 2010
 Community Choice, AppCircus at DroidCon 2010
 CTIA E-Tech Award 2011, CTIA 2011
 Jury Award, Mobile Premier Awards 2011 Winners of AppCircus Events
 Most Innovative App at the Global Mobile Awards, Mobile World Congress 2012
 The People's Voice Webby Award for Experimental and Innovation 2012
 Best Startup Business, Guardian Innovation Awards 2012
 Coolest Tech Innovation, Europa Awards 
 Lovie Award People's Lovie for mobile innovation 2013

See also 
 List of most downloaded Android applications

References

External links
 Official site

Microsoft subsidiaries
Input methods for handheld devices
User interface techniques
Microsoft acquisitions
Android (operating system) software
Android virtual keyboards
Virtual keyboards
2016 mergers and acquisitions